Below are the squads for the 2013 Toulon Tournament. Each team had to submit a maximum of 22 players.

Players in boldface have been capped at full international level at some point in their career.

Group A

Colombia
Coach:  Carlos Restrepo

Congo DR
Coach:  Sébastien Migné

France
Coach:  Willy Sagnol

South Korea
Coach:  Lee Kwang-Jong

United States
Coach:  Tab Ramos

Group B

Belgium
Coach:  Johan Walem

Brazil
Coach:  Alexandre Gallo

Mexico
Coach:  Sergio Almaguer

Nigeria
Coach:  John Obuh

Portugal
Coach:  Edgar Borges

Footnotes

Toulon Tournament squads
Squad